Green Bag may refer to:

 The Green Bag (1889–1914), a defunct legal magazine
 The Green Bag (1997), a law journal established in 1997
 Green Bags, reusable shopping bags
 Debbie Meyer Green Bags, a brand of food storage bags
 "Little Green Bag", a 1969 George Baker song